Bathymunida is a genus of squat lobsters in the family Munididae, containing the following species:

 Bathymunida avatea Macpherson & Baba, 2006
 Bathymunida balssi Van Dam, 1938
 Bathymunida brevirostris (Yokoya, 1933)
 Bathymunida corniculata Macpherson, 2013
 Bathymunida dissimilis Baba & de Saint Laurent, 1996
 Bathymunida eurybregma Baba & de Saint Laurent, 1996
 Bathymunida frontis Baba & de Saint Laurent, 1996
 Bathymunida longipes Van Dam, 1938
 Bathymunida nebulosa Baba & de Saint Laurent, 1996
 Bathymunida ocularis Baba & de Saint Laurent, 1996
 Bathymunida polae Balss, 1914
 Bathymunida quadratirostrata Melin, 1939
 Bathymunida recta Baba & de Saint Laurent, 1996
 Bathymunida rudis Baba & de Saint Laurent, 1996
 Bathymunida sibogae Van Dam, 1938

References

External links

Squat lobsters
Taxa named by Heinrich Balss